Below is a list of the largest exoplanets so far discovered, in terms of physical size, ordered by radius.

Caveats 
This list of extrasolar objects may and will change over time because of inconsistency between journals, different methods used to examine these objects and the already extremely hard task of discovering exoplanets, or any other large objects for that matter. Then there is the fact that these objects might be brown dwarfs, sub-brown dwarfs, or not exist at all. Because of this, this list only cites the best measurements to date and is prone to change. Remember, these objects are not stars, and are quite small on a universal or even stellar scale.

List

The sizes are listed in units of Jupiter radii (71,492 km). All planets listed are larger than 1.7 times the size of the largest planet in the Solar System, Jupiter. Some planets that are smaller than  have been included for the sake of comparison.

See also 
 List of smallest exoplanets
 List of largest cosmic structures
 List of largest galaxies
 List of largest nebulae
 List of largest known stars
 Lists of astronomical objects
 List of most massive exoplanets
 List of most massive stars

References 

Largest
Exoplanets, largest